Frank Ronstadt (born 21 July 1997) is a German professional footballer who plays as a right midfielder or right-back for 2. Bundesliga club Darmstadt 98.

Career
In May 2021 it was announced that Ronstadt would be joining 2. Bundesliga club SV Darmstadt 98 from Würzburger Kickers, who had been relegated from the league, for the forthcoming 2021–22 season.

References

Living people
1997 births
Association football midfielders
Association football fullbacks
German footballers
FC St. Pauli players
Hamburger SV II players
Hamburger SV players
SV Werder Bremen II players
Würzburger Kickers players
SV Darmstadt 98 players
2. Bundesliga players
3. Liga players
Regionalliga players
Footballers from Hamburg